(I will not let go of my Jesus), is a church cantata written by Johann Sebastian Bach. He composed the chorale cantata in Leipzig for the first Sunday after the Epiphany and first performed it on 7 January 1725. It is based on the hymn "Meinen Jesum laß ich nicht" by Christian Keymann.

History and words 

Bach wrote the chorale cantata in his second year in Leipzig for the First Sunday after Epiphany. The prescribed readings for the Sunday were taken from the Epistle to the Romans, speaking of the duties of a Christian, and from the Gospel of Luke, the finding in the Temple.

A year earlier, on the same occasion, Bach had reflected , from the point of view of a person who had lost Jesus. This cantata text is based on the chorale in six stanzas by Christian Keymann (1658). The text of the hymn begins, as in the former work, with an idea close to the gospel: the Christian does not want to let go of Jesus, as his parents had wished not to lose their 12-year-old boy, but then the chorale pursues the thought of being united with Jesus after death. An unknown poet kept the first and the last stanza, and paraphrased the inner stanzas to a sequence of as many recitatives and arias. Bach first performed the cantata on 7 January 1725, one day after , for Epiphany.

Scoring and structure 

The cantata in six movements is scored for four soloists, soprano, alto, tenor, and bass, a four-part choir, horn to play the cantus firmus with the soprano, oboe d'amore, two violins, viola, and basso continuo.

 Chorus: 
 Recitative (tenor): 
 Aria (tenor): 
 Recitative (bass): 
 Aria (soprano, alto): 
 Chorale:

Music 

The lower voices are set mostly in homophony, while the orchestra plays its own themes in introduction, interludes and accompaniment. The character of the movement is a minuet, and the oboe d'amore takes a virtuosic concertante leading part. The phrase "" (cling to him like a burr) is illustrated by all three lower voices holding a note for three measures as if clinging to it. John Eliot Gardiner notes the "gentle, almost naïve tone of voice to reflect the submissive character of the text". A short secco recitative leads to a tenor aria, which is accompanied by the oboe, while the strings play "a persistent four-note drumming" to express "" (fear and terror). Alfred Dürr compares these repetitions to similar figures in the alto recitative "", movement 49 of Bach's Christmas Oratorio, Part V. In another secco recitative the term "" (after my completed course) is pictured by a scale spanning an octave. A duet of soprano and alto, only accompanied by the continuo, moves like a dance in simple periods of four measures. The cantata is closed by the final stanza in a four-part setting.

Recordings 
 Bach Cantatas Vol. 1 – Advent and Christmas, Karl Richter, Münchener Bach-Chor, Münchener Bach-Orchester, Lotte Schädle, Hertha Töpper, Ernst Haefliger, Theo Adam, Archiv Produktion 1967
 Die Bach Kantate Vol. 21, Helmuth Rilling, Gächinger Kantorei, Bach-Collegium Stuttgart, Arleen Augér, Helen Watts, Aldo Baldin, Wolfgang Schöne, Hänssler 1980
 J.S. Bach: Das Kantatenwerk – Sacred Cantatas Vol. 7, Nikolaus Harnoncourt, Tölzer Knabenchor, Concentus Musicus Wien, soloists of the Tölzer Knabenchor, Kurt Equiluz, Thomas Thomaschke, Teldec 1980
 Bach Edition Vol. 20 – Cantatas Vol. 11, Pieter Jan Leusink, Holland Boys Choir, Netherlands Bach Collegium, Ruth Holton, Sytse Buwalda, Knut Schoch, Bas Ramselaar, Brilliant Classics 1999
 Bach Cantatas Vol. 18: Berlin / Weimar/Leipzig/Hamburg / For Christmas Day & for Epiphany / For the 1st Sunday after Epiphany, John Eliot Gardiner, Monteverdi Choir, English Baroque Soloists, Claron McFadden, Michael Chance, James Gilchrist, Peter Harvey, Soli Deo Gloria 2000
 J.S. Bach: Complete Cantatas Vol. 12, Ton Koopman, Amsterdam Baroque Orchestra & Choir, Lisa Larsson, Annette Markert, Christoph Prégardien, Klaus Mertens, Antoine Marchand 2000
 J.S. Bach: Cantatas Vol. 32, Masaaki Suzuki, Bach Collegium Japan, Yukari Nonoshita, Robin Blaze, Andreas Weller, Peter Kooy, BIS 2005

Notes

References

Sources 

 
 Meinen Jesum lass ich nicht BWV 124; BC A 30 / Chorale cantata (1st Sunday of Epiphany) Bach Digital
 Cantata BWV 124 Meinen Jesum laß ich nicht history, scoring, sources for text and music, translations to various languages, discography, discussion, bach-cantatas website
 BWV 124 Meinen Jesum laß ich nicht English translation, University of Vermont
 BWV 124 Meinen Jesum laß ich nicht text, scoring, University of Alberta
 Chapter 34 BWV 124 Meinen Jesum Lass ich nicht / My Jesus, I shall not abandon you. Julian Mincham, 2010
 BWV 124.6 bach-chorales.com

Church cantatas by Johann Sebastian Bach
1725 compositions